Szeligi may refer to the following places:
Szeligi, Płock County in Masovian Voivodeship (east-central Poland)
Szeligi, Sochaczew County in Masovian Voivodeship (east-central Poland)
Szeligi, Świętokrzyskie Voivodeship (south-central Poland)
Szeligi, Warsaw West County in Masovian Voivodeship (east-central Poland)
Szeligi, Warmian-Masurian Voivodeship (north Poland)

See also
Szeliga coat of arms